Jan Vacek (yahn VAH-tseck; born 10 May 1976) is a retired professional male tennis player from the Czech Republic.

Vacek reached a career high ATP singles ranking of World No. 61, achieved on 5 August 2002. He also reached a career high ATP doubles ranking of World No. 115, achieved on 25 April 2005.

Vacek successfully played in all four Grand Slam tournament main draws, highlighted by reaching the fourth round at the 2002 Wimbledon Championships.

Vacek reached 21 singles finals throughout his career, posting a record of 13 wins and 8 losses, which includes a 4–3 result in ATP Challenger finals. Unseeded at the 2001 Brasil Open, he won the singles championship, defeating eighth seed Mariano Zabaleta 3–6, 6–4, 7–6(8–6) in the second round, sixth seed Alexandre Simoni 7–6(7–5), 6–2 in the semi finals and fifth seed Fernando Meligeni 2–6, 7–6(7–2), 6–3 in the final to claim his first and only ATP Tour title.

ATP Tour finals

Singles (1 title)

Doubles (1 runner-up)

ATP Challenger and ITF Futures Finals

Singles: 20 (12–8)

Doubles: 11 (5–6)

Performance timeline

Singles

External links
 
 
 

1976 births
Czech male tennis players
Tennis players from Prague
Living people